Seekda  is a hospitality management software company and a provider in the field of e-tourism. Headquartered in Vienna, Austria , the company was founded in 
2007, and employs around 50 people, mainly IT staff and tourism experts.

Seekda develops and offers solutions for the tourism industry that help hotels achieve their sales goals through a web-based interface. Seekda's portfolio includes a customizable booking engine with revenue-generating marketing features, connections to the most OTA and META channels, and hotel programs (PMS). In addition, Seekda matches its customers with brands through loyalty and rewards programs.

Seekda's target groups are accommodation providers of all kinds - from campsites, vacation apartments and vacation homes to individual hotels or large hotel chains.

References

External links
Seekda official website
Legal entry in company register
Entry in austria justice Company register query

Software companies of Austria
Software companies established in 2007
2007 establishments in Austria
2020 disestablishments in Austria
Software companies disestablished in 2020
2013 mergers and acquisitions